was a province of Japan on the Inland Sea side of western Honshū, in what is today western Okayama Prefecture. It was sometimes called , with Bizen and Bingo Provinces; those three provinces were settled in the late 7th Century, dividing former Kibi Province. Bitchu bordered Hōki, Mimasaka, Bizen, and Bingo Provinces.

The ancient capital and temples were built around Sōja. For much of the Muromachi Period, the province was dominated by the Hosokawa clan, who resided in Shikoku and allowed the province a degree of independence. By the Sengoku Period, other clans fought over Bitchu, and Oda Nobunaga and Mōri Terumoto were fighting in the province when Oda died, leading to a division of the province. After 1600, the province was divided among a variety of han (fiefs), and included a number of castles. By the time the provinces were reorganized into prefectures, the dominant city was the port, Kurashiki.

Shrines and temples
Kibitsu jinja was the chief Shinto shrine (ichinomiya) of Bitchū.

Historical districts
 Okayama Prefecture
 Aga District (阿賀郡) - merged with Tetta District to become Atetsu District (阿哲郡) on April 1, 1900
 Asakuchi District (浅口郡)
 Jōbō District (上房郡) - dissolved
 Kawakami District (川上郡) - dissolved
 Kayō District (賀陽郡) - merged with Shimotsu District to become Kibi District (吉備郡) on April 1, 1900
 Kuboya District (窪屋郡) - merged with Tsuu District to become Tsukubo District (都窪郡) on April 1, 1900
 Oda District (小田郡)
 Shimotsu District (下道郡) - merged with Kayō District to become Kibi District on April 1, 1900
 Shitsuki District (後月郡) - dissolved
 Tetta District (哲多郡) - merged with Aga District to become Atetsu District on April 1, 1900
 Tsuu District (都宇郡) - merged with Kuboya District to become Tsukubo District on April 1, 1900

Notes

References
 Nussbaum, Louis-Frédéric and Käthe Roth. (2005).  Japan encyclopedia. Cambridge: Harvard University Press. ;  OCLC 58053128

External links 

 "Bitchū Province" at JapaneseCastleExplorer.com
  Murdoch's map of provinces, 1903

Former provinces of Japan